Vesicapalpus is a genus of South American sheet weavers that was first described by Alfred Frank Millidge in 1991.

Species
 it contains only two species:
Vesicapalpus serranus Rodrigues & Ott, 2006 – Brazil
Vesicapalpus simplex Millidge, 1991 – Brazil, Argentina

See also
 List of Linyphiidae species (Q–Z)

References

Araneomorphae genera
Linyphiidae
Spiders of South America